Bahavar (also Romanized as Bahāvar) is a village in Howmeh Rural District, in the Central District of Abhar County, Zanjan Province, Iran. At the 2006 census, its population was 63, in 10 families.

References 

Populated places in Abhar County